The State Advertising Agency of the Republic of Azerbaijan implements control the placement of advertisements in the open space and the production and distribution of advertising placed on advertising carriers. Aydin Ibadov is the director of the agency. The liquidation and reorganization of the agency is carried out in accordance with the decisions of the President of the Republic of Azerbaijan.

Objectives 
The agency tend to ensure that the advertising environment is maintained, improved, and the protection of legal and technical requirements for the content of the ads and advertising carriers. The agency reduce time for the registration of advertising carriers, instructs, and helps the distributors of advertisements in order avoid paying illegal fees.

History 
State Advertising Agency of the Republic of Azerbaijan is established on June 20, 2017, according to decree that was signed on the basis of controlling and unifying regulations on production, and distribution of ads for their placements in the open space within the borders of the Republic of Azerbaijan. According to the Decree, SDA as public legal agency has authority to fine those who violates the state regulations on advertisements.

Structure 
The agency is operating under by a supervisory board and a director. The Board of agency implement overall control over it and consisted of 3 members including the head of the Board who are appointed and dismissed by the President of the Republic of Azerbaijan. The term of office for them is 5 years. The works of the Board and its activities are organized and directed by the head of the Board. He determines the agenda of the meetings and holds sessions and leads them.

The Director of Agency is responsible for performing the duties entrusted to the Agency by the President of the Republic of Azerbaijan.

Rights of the Agency 
The agency has the following rights according to its statue;

 Preparing and submitting relevant drafts of legal acts on corresponding fields and also participating in their preparation of those drafts;
 Attracting experts in its activities in accordance with certain agreements;
 Cooperating with international organizations, relevant bodies (agencies) and distributors of advertising of foreign countries in order to explore possibilities of applying international experiences, and learn from their experiences;
 Questioning state entities, local self-government bodies, legal and natural persons about required information (documents) or directly acquiring those information from them;
 Preparing analytical materials on the relevant fields, conducting researches and making certain suggestions;
 Holding conferences, seminars and other events in accordance with its activities;

References

External links 
 
 
 

Government agencies of Azerbaijan
Government of Azerbaijan
Government agencies established in 2017